Teretia elegantissima is an extinct species of sea snail, a marine gastropod mollusk in the family Raphitomidae.

Description

Distribution
Fossils of this marine species were found in Pliocene strata off Bologna, Italy

References

 Foresti, L. (1874) Catalogo dei molluschi fossili pliocenici delle colline bolognesi: Mem.Acc. Sc. Ist. Bologna, ser II, 7, 1–99.
 Brunetti, M.; Vecchi, G. (2003). Sul ritrovamento di Teretia elengatissima (Foresti, 1868) in terreni pliocenici dell'Emilia e della Toscana. Bollettino della Società Paleontologica Italiana. 42: 49-57

External links
 Morassi M. & Bonfitto A. (2015). New Indo-Pacific species of the genus Teretia Norman, 1888 (Gastropoda: Raphitomidae). Zootaxa. 3911(4): 560-570 
 

elegantissima
Gastropods described in 1868